The Pejepscot Proprietors was a company of land investors who colonized the current towns of Brunswick, Topsham and Harpswell, Maine, between the years of  and .

The area known as Pejepscot, Maine, was first inhabited by the Wabanaki Native Americans. During the European colonization of the Americas, the first settler was Thomas Purchase, settling on the banks of the Androscoggin River in Brunswick, at the site of Fort Andross and Pejepscot Falls. After the Native American wars came to a close, the proprietors acquired the land holdings from Purchase's successor, Richard Wharton, in the Maine district of the Province of Massachusetts Bay, and furthered the colonization of Maine.

References

Pejepscot, Maine
History of Maine
Brunswick, Maine
Topsham, Maine
Harpswell, Maine